Attatha is a genus of moths of the family Noctuidae. The genus was erected by Frederic Moore in 1878.

Species
 Attatha attathoides (Karsch, 1896)
 Attatha barlowi A. E. Prout, 1921
 Attatha ethiopica Hampson, 1910
 Attatha flavata C. Swinhoe, 1917 (syn: Attatha coccinea C. Swinhoe, 1917)
 Attatha ino (Drury, 1782) (syn: Attatha mundicolor (Walker, 1865), Attatha notata (Fabricius, 1794))
 Attatha metaleuca Hampson, 1913
 Attatha regalis (Moore, 1872)
 Attatha sinuosa (Laporte, 1973)

References

Catocalinae